Candy Lo is a Canto- rock singer-songwriter and film actress from Hong Kong. Formerly the lead vocalist of the band Black and Blue, Lo launched her solo career in 1998 and is best known for the singles, "Trash" and "Please Break Up".

Career

1995-1996: Black & Blue
Prior to going solo, Lo was the lead vocalist in the Hong Kong indie rock band Black & Blue. The band released two albums: Hope in Just One Day (1995) containing songs mostly sung in English; and Black & Blue (1996) sung completely in Cantonese, a decision made with their record label to make themselves more understandable to fans. Lo wrote all the lyrics on both albums.

1998-2005: Solo Career with Sony Music
In 1998, Lo signed with Sony Music Hong Kong to launch a career as a solo artist. Her first release under Sony was the EP Don't Have to be...Too Perfect which contained the breakthrough radio-hit "Trash", considered one of her signature songs. Although "Trash" was a fairly mainstream ballad, the rest of the EP showed a continuity with her indie past. Lo would later ditch Keith Chan and Wyman Wong who had a dominant presence on the EP to work with entirely different songwriters and lyricists for her debut album. Released in late 1998, Lo's first full-length solo album was titled Miao, which referred to her love of cats and how "they listen while people sometimes don't."Miao was apparently released to "more than disappointing" album sales and low radio airplay, with producer Kubert Leung remarking that the public had "failed to grasp the concept of the album."

Lo's second album, Getting Closer to Candy Lo (1999), represented a more conscious attempt to connect with a mainstream audience, while retaining a sense of the unique individualism found in Miao. The album continued to set Lo's music apart from the mainstream. It contained five of her compositions, including the single "Regeneration," which was influenced by 70's art rock. Upon release, the album garnered her some comparisons as "Hong Kong's Faith Yang". Art direction for the album was done by William Chang.

A substantially more commercial direction was signalled by the release of 2002's Appreciating the Taste of Life, which gave Lo her first-ever smash hit, "Please Break Up". The song topped the charts and won her year-end awards at all four of Hong Kong's major radio and TV stations, making it a career highlight for Lo. A duet version of the song was recorded with Taiwan singer Leehom Wang to accompany the second edition of the album. The song remains one of the most frequently requested songs at Hong Kong karaoke bars to this day.

In May 2003, Lo held her first stadium concert at the Hong Kong Coliseum, True Music 1st Flight Live 2003, performing for two nights. This coincided with the release of the album Candy's Airline, which spawned one of her biggest hits, "Love Triangle", and was followed up later in the year by Flower Talk which contained a further hit, "Fall & Blossom".

After a string of radio-friendly albums, Lo released her final album with Sony, Evolution Theory in 2005, which returned to her alternative musical roots and is one of her most uncompromising albums to date. Like Flower Talk which preceded it, the album contains lyrics which deal with Buddhist themes.

2007-2011: Process & Retirement
After a 2-year musical hiatus (during which she appeared in six films), Lo released her 10th studio album, Process, on 10 June 2007, upon joining her new record company "WOW Music". She is the first artist to release a USB flash memory digital album in Asia. Process contained the radio chart-topping hit "Love to the Limit" and a Mandarin song, "Run Slowly" which was previously available for download at Candy's temporary website https://web.archive.org/web/20071016051856/http://www.candylo.hk/ and saw a hit rate of more than 200,000 before being taken down.

At a concert in 2011, Lo announced her retirement as a singer, though stated that she will continue to produce music behind-the-scenes. She has previously expressed dissatisfaction with the Hong Kong music industry and of having had a "difficult 13 years."

2014-present: Return to music
In 2014, Lo signed onto the newly founded label, WhatsUp Music Limited and collaborated with the band Fabel on the single "Self-Love". "Self-Love" topped two of the four major Hong Kong singles charts and received a nomination for "Best Vocal Collaboration" at the 2014 CASH Golden Sail Music Awards. She released two further singles under the label, namely, "Pastoral Dream" and "The Philosopher" in 2015.

In November 2017, Lo released the single, "Tomorrow We Will Run by the Sea". The single coincided with her concert series RE:TURN 盧巧音Candy Lo Concert 2017 held at the Hong Kong Macpherson Stadium on 20–21 December.

In November 2018, Lo contributed vocals to the alt-rock single, "Sunset Party", as part of a collaborative project between composer Vicky Fung and lyricist Chow Yiu Fai.

Acting
Lo has appeared in numerous films, often as a supporting player in comedies. Notably, she was nominated three times at the 20th Hong Kong Film Awards (2001) for her roles in Tsui Hark's Time and Tide (Best Newcomer, Best Supporting Actress) and Twelve Nights [十二夜] (Best Newcomer). She received further nominations for her supporting roles in Truth or Dare : 6th Floor Rear Flat in 2004 and Six Strong Guys in 2005.

Personal life
Lo married Sammy So, lead singer of the band Kolor, in April 2013.

Discography

Albums
 Miao... (1998)
 貼近盧巧音 (Getting Closer to Candy Lo) (1999)
 色放 (Colour Release) (2000)
 MUSE (2000)
 Fantasy (2001)
 賞味人間 (Appreciating the Taste of Life) (2002)
 糖果航空 (Candy's Airline) (2003)
 花言.巧語 (Flower Talk) (2003)
 天演論 (Evolution Theory) (2005)
 Process (2007)

EPs
 不需要...完美得可怕 (Don't Have to be... Too Perfect) (1998)
 L (2008)
 Nuri (2012)

Compilations
 喜歡戀愛 (Like To Love) (2001)
 4 Seasons in One Day (2004)

Live albums
 True Music 1st Flight Live 2003 (2003)

Filmography
What is a Good Teacher (自從他来了) (2000)
Twelve Nights (十二夜) (2000)
Time And Tide (順流逆流) (2000)
Funeral March (常在我心) (2001)
No Problem 2 (沒問題2) (2002)
Marry a Rich Man (嫁個有錢人) (2002)
Happy Family (風流家族) (2002)
Tiramisu (戀愛行星) (2002)
The Eye (見鬼) (2002)
If You Care... (賤精先生) (2002)
Summer I Love You (好心相愛) (2002)
Truth or Dare: 6th Floor Rear Flat (六樓後座) (2003)
Men Suddenly in Black (大丈夫) (2003)
Herbal Tea (男上女下) (2004)
Six Strong Guys (六壯士) (2004)
Bug Me Not! (虫不知 ) (2005)
Teacher in University (高校教師) (2005)
The Heavenly Kings (四大天王) (2006)
Cocktail (半醉人間) (2006)
Half Twin (半邊靈) (2006)
Feel It, Say It (談談情, 說說性) (2006)
The Wife from Hell (妻骨未寒) (2006)
Fear Factors (恐懼元素) (2007)
House of Mahjong (嚦咕嚦咕對對碰) (2007)
Happy Funeral (六樓后座2 家屬謝禮) (2008)
Split Second Murders (死神傻了) (2009)
Punished (報應) (2011)
Probation Order (澀青298-03) (2013)
77 Heartbreaks (原諒他77次) (2017)
Our Time Will Come (2017)

References

External links
 
 Official website
 Candy Lo's Blog
 Facebook
 Instagram
 Weibo

1974 births
Cantopop singer-songwriters
Women rock singers
21st-century Hong Kong women singers
Hong Kong film actresses
Hong Kong rock musicians
Hong Kong singer-songwriters
Living people
People from Zhongshan
21st-century Hong Kong actresses
20th-century Hong Kong women singers